On 5 June 2013, a fight between far-left and far-right activists in Paris resulted in the death of 18-year-old left-winger Clément Méric. Two right-wing skinheads, Esteban Morillo and Samuel Dufour, were indicted for his death. In September 2018, they were convicted of manslaughter and weapon supply respectively, and sentenced to 11 and 5 years in prison respectively. Morillo was freed on licence that November after an appeal, Dufour in January 2019, and a second trial began in December 2019. In June 2021, they were sentenced to 8 and 5 years respectively.

The lengthy judicial process centred around contentious points: Méric's own responsibility in the violence, and whether or not the accused had brass knuckles, an illegal weapon regardless of context.

Clément Méric

Clément Méric was from Brest, Brittany. He was a student at Sciences Po in Paris. Méric was known to the police as a member of a far-left group that actively sought out violent confrontation with the far-right. Méric was in remission for leukaemia at the time of his death.

Esteban Morillo and Samuel Dufour
Morillo was born in December 1992 in Cádiz, Spain and grew up in Neuilly-Saint-Front in the department of Aisne. The village's mayor, André Rigaud, described his parents as normal people, but in 2010 opened a police investigation into Morillo and his neo-Nazi gang. In May 2011 he received a criminal record for knife and brass knuckle possession. Eighteen months before the fight, he had moved to Saint-Ouen-sur-Seine in the Parisian region, to live with his girlfriend and work as a security guard. Both were members of Troisième Voie, a far-right organisation.

Dufour was born in Dieppe and was an apprentice baker. He was also a member of Troisième Voie and had neo-Nazi tattoos.

Death
A sale of Ben Sherman and Fred Perry apparel – popular with both extreme groups – was taking place on the Rue de Caumartin in the 9th arrondissement of Paris. The far-left group verbally provoked the far-right group, and physical violence spilt onto the street, resulting in Méric's death.

Later in June 2013, security footage from Paris's RATP Group public transit agency showed Méric hitting Morillo in the back. Morillo then turned around and punched him in the face. The video however did not make it clear whether Morillo was armed with brass knuckles, which would have been illegal regardless of context.

Legal process
The Paris prosecutor wanted to charge Morillo with murder, but the investigating judge rejected this and instead charged him with manslaughter.

In September 2018, Morillo was found guilty of manslaughter and Dufour of supplying brass knuckles, while a third man was acquitted of violence to other people. Morillo was sentenced to 11 years in prison and Dufour to seven. Morillo was imprisoned for only 55 days before he appealed and was released on licence. Dufour was also released on appeal in January 2019, ahead of an appeals trial in Évry in December of that year.

The appeals trial was postponed due to a public transport strike, and then the COVID-19 pandemic. In June 2021, Morillo was sentenced to 8 years and Dufour to 5.

Reactions

President François Hollande and prime minister Jean-Marc Ayrault condemned the death of Méric and pledged to stop the far right. Marine Le Pen, leader of the Front National, condemned the death and distanced her party from it.

Three far-right groups linked to those who killed Méric, including two headed by Serge Ayoub, were proscribed by the French government. Government minister Najat Vallaud-Belkacem criticised national media for granting interviews with Ayoub after the death.

Rallies in memory of Méric took place across France, and on subsequent anniversaries of his death.

References

June 2013 events in France
2013 in Paris
Deaths by person in Paris
Deaths by beating in Europe
9th arrondissement of Paris
2013 crimes in France
2010s crimes in Paris
Neo-Nazism in France